The following lists events that happened in 1978 in Iceland.

Incumbents
President – Kristján Eldjárn
Prime Minister – Geir Hallgrímsson, Ólafur Jóhannesson

Events

Births

16 February – Vala Flosadóttir, athlete.
15 March – Arnar Viðarsson, footballer
15 September – Eiður Guðjohnsen, footballer
27 October – Gylfi Einarsson, footballer
1 December – Magni Ásgeirsson, musician

Deaths
28 March – Vilhjálmur Vilhjálmsson, singer (b. 1945)
4 October – Una Guðmundsdóttir, educator and psychic (b. 1894)

References

 
1970s in Iceland
Iceland
Iceland
Years of the 20th century in Iceland